Mansfield Township is a civil township of Iron County in the U.S. state of Michigan. The population was 243 at the 2000 census.

Geography

The Michigamme River flows through Mansfield Township.

Communities
Colony Corners is an unincorporated community in the township
Mansfield Location is an unincorporated community in the township

Demographics
As of the census of 2000, there were 243 people, 104 households, and 71 families residing in the township.  The population density was 2.4 per square mile (0.9/km2).  There were 236 housing units at an average density of 2.4 per square mile (0.9/km2).  The racial makeup of the township was 95.06% White, 0.82% African American, 0.41% Native American, 0.41% Asian, 2.06% from other races, and 1.23% from two or more races. Hispanic or Latino of any race were 2.06% of the population. 19.0% were of Polish, 14.8% English, 14.8% Swedish, 9.7% Finnish, 6.5% German and 6.0% European ancestry according to Census 2000.

There were 104 households, out of which 17.3% had children under the age of 18 living with them, 59.6% were married couples living together, 4.8% had a female householder with no husband present, and 30.8% were non-families. 27.9% of all households were made up of individuals, and 12.5% had someone living alone who was 65 years of age or older.  The average household size was 2.34 and the average family size was 2.81.

In the township the population was spread out, with 15.6% under the age of 18, 7.8% from 18 to 24, 20.2% from 25 to 44, 36.2% from 45 to 64, and 20.2% who were 65 years of age or older.  The median age was 49 years. For every 100 females, there were 122.9 males.  For every 100 females age 18 and over, there were 118.1 males.

The median income for a household in the township was $36,458, and the median income for a family was $46,250. Males had a median income of $36,042 versus $26,250 for females. The per capita income for the township was $17,154.  None of the families and 5.3% of the population were living below the poverty line, including no under eighteens and 8.1% of those over 64.

References

Townships in Iron County, Michigan
Townships in Michigan